Clofibride is a fibrate. Clofibride is a derivative of clofibrate. In the body it is converted into 4-chlorophenoxyisobutyric acid (clofibric acid), which is the true hypolipidemic agent. So clofibride, just like clofibrate is a prodrug of clofibric acid.

References

2-Methyl-2-phenoxypropanoic acid derivatives
Prodrugs
Chloroarenes
Carboxamides